Islambakhty (İslambaqtı) is a rural locality (a selo) in Tarkazinsky Selsoviet, Yermekeyevsky District, Bashkortostan, Russia. The population was 446 as of 2010. There are 7 streets.

Geography 
Islambakhty is located 49 km south of Yermekeyevo (the district's administrative centre) by road. Ik is the nearest rural locality.

References 

Rural localities in Yermekeyevsky District